The Six Ministries of Joseon were the major executive bodies of the Korean Joseon Dynasty. They included ministries of Personnel (Ijo), Taxation (Hojo), Rites (Yejo), Military Affairs (Byeongjo), Punishments (Hyeongjo), and Public works (Gongjo).

History
It was established in 1298. The ministries system of Joseon was similar in outline to that of the preceding Goryeo dynasty, but in practice, it had a big difference. While Goryeo had a ministrative policy where the King had the central power, in Joseon, the scholars and bureaucrats had greater control. The ministries were much more powerful under Joseon, and their importance grew as the dynasty wore on.

In December 1895, after the First Sino-Japanese War and as a part of the Gabo Reform, a cabinet of seven ministries was modeled after the Japanese one, which had been established only ten years earlier.

Composition

See also 
 Joseon Dynasty politics
 History of Korea
 Six Ministries of the Nguyễn dynasty 
 Three Departments and Six Ministries - the original Chinese model; only the six ministries was retained in a similar format

References 

Joseon dynasty